Caleb John Thielbar (born January 31, 1987) is an American professional baseball pitcher for the Minnesota Twins of Major League Baseball (MLB). He made his MLB debut with the Twins in 2013.

Career

Early career
Thielbar attended Randolph High School in Randolph, Minnesota, and South Dakota State University, where he played college baseball for the South Dakota State Jackrabbits. The Milwaukee Brewers selected Thielbar in the 18th round of the 2009 MLB draft. The Brewers released Thielbar in 2011, and he then pitched for the St. Paul Saints of the American Association of Professional Baseball, a independent baseball league.

Minnesota Twins
Thielbar signed a minor league deal with the Minnesota Twins in August 2011. The Twins added him to their 40-man roster after the 2012 season.

On May 20, 2013, Twins promoted Thielbar to the major leagues. He made his MLB debut that day, pitching two innings. He became the first South Dakota State baseball player to reach MLB. He remained in the Twins bullpen for the remainder of the season, appearing in 49 games and pitching 46 innings with a 1.76 ERA and 0.826 WHIP.

Thielbar began the 2014 season in the Twins bullpen, making 54 appearances in which he pitched  and pitching to a 3.40 ERA. In 2015, he pitched five innings for the team. On July 31, 2015, he was designated for assignment after appearing in just 6 games.

San Diego Padres
On August 8, 2015, San Diego Padres claimed Thielbar off waivers from the Twins. The Padres assigned him to their Triple A affiliate, the El Paso Chihuahuas, for whom he pitched 12.1 innings, giving up only one earned run. He was designated for assignment on August 30.

St. Paul Saints and Miami Marlins
On March 29, 2016, Thielbar signed with the St. Paul Saints of the American Association of Independent Professional Baseball. He was 5-2 with four saves and a 2.39 ERA in 64 innings.

On November 17, 2016, Thielbar signed a minor league deal with the Miami Marlins. He was released on March 31, 2017. On May 27, 2017, Thielbar signed with St. Paul for the rest of the 2017 season. He was 2-1 with one save and a 2.01 ERA in 22.1 innings in which he struck out 23 batters.

Detroit Tigers
On January 23, 2018, Thielbar signed a minor league deal with the Detroit Tigers. He split the season between the AA Erie SeaWolves and the AAA Toledo Mud Hens, and was a combined 7-1 with a 2.05 ERA in 57 innings. 

He resigned a minor league deal on October 30, 2018. He was assigned to AAA Toledo Mud Hens for the 2019 season, for whom he was 2-1 with four saves and a 3.30 ERA, as in 76.1 innings he struck out 92 batters.

Atlanta Braves
On August 30, 2019, Thielbar was traded to the Atlanta Braves in exchange for cash considerations. He pitched two scoreless innings and had one save for the team's AAA affiliate in Gwinnett. He became a free agent following the 2019 season. 

After the season, on October 10, he was selected for the United States national baseball team in the 2019 WBSC Premier 12.

In 2019, Thielbar became the pitching coach for Augustana College.

Second stint with Minnesota Twins
On December 13, 2019, Thielbar signed a minor league deal with the Minnesota Twins. He arranged to continue as pitching coach for Augustana. On August 3, 2020, the Twins selected Thielbar to the active roster. On August 4, he made his first appearance of the season and first in the majors in a little over four years. He finished the season with a 2.25 ERA in 17 games.

Thielbar signed a one year, $650,000 contract for the 2021 season.

On January 13, 2023, Thielbar agreed to a one-year, $2.4 million contract with the Twins, avoiding salary arbitration.

Personal life
Thielbar and his wife Carissa have one son together.

References

External links

1987 births
Living people
Arizona League Brewers players
Augustana (South Dakota) Vikings baseball coaches
Baseball players from Minnesota
El Paso Chihuahuas players
Erie SeaWolves players
Fort Myers Miracle players
Gwinnett Stripers players
Helena Brewers players
Major League Baseball pitchers
Minnesota Twins players
New Britain Rock Cats players
People from Northfield, Minnesota
Peoria Javelinas players
Rochester Red Wings players
South Dakota State Jackrabbits baseball players
St. Paul Saints players
Toledo Mud Hens players
United States national baseball team players
Wisconsin Timber Rattlers players
2019 WBSC Premier12 players